Hwang Seong-eun (born February 28, 1993) is a South Korean sport shooter. She placed 17th in the women's 25 metre pistol event at the 2016 Summer Olympics.

References

1993 births
Living people
ISSF pistol shooters
South Korean female sport shooters
Olympic shooters of South Korea
Shooters at the 2016 Summer Olympics